Oleh Oleksandrovych Vlasov (born 25 October 2002) is a Ukrainian professional footballer who plays as a midfielder for Ukrainian Premier League club Dynamo Kyiv.

Career
Vlasov is a product of FC Bukovyna Chernivtsi Youth Sportive School System. His first trainer was Andriy Lakhnyuk. In summer 2019 he was transferred to the Vorskla Poltava.

He made his debut as a second time substituted player for Vorskla Poltava in the Ukrainian Premier League in a home draw match against FC Olimpik Donetsk on 28 June 2020.

References

External links
 
 

2002 births
Living people
Ukrainian footballers
FC Vorskla Poltava players
FC Dynamo Kyiv players
Ukrainian Premier League players
Sportspeople from Chernivtsi
Association football midfielders